Campiglossa irrorata is a species of tephritid or fruit flies in the genus Campiglossa of the family Tephritidae.

Distribution
Sweden, Finland, Central Europe, Ukraine, Kazakhstan.

References

Tephritinae
Insects described in 1814
Diptera of Europe
Diptera of Asia